Alexandros Kavvadias (born 10 May 2000) is a Greek professional footballer who plays as a forward for Haidari.

References

2000 births
Living people
Greek footballers
Super League Greece players
Panetolikos F.C. players
Kallithea F.C. players
Association football forwards